Altranft station is a railway station in the Altranft district of the spa town of Bad Freienwalde (Oder), located in the Märkisch-Oderland district in Brandenburg, Germany.

Location
The Altranft station marks  on the Eberswalde–Frankfurt (Oder) railway, as calculated from the Berlin Nordbahnhof. Altranft is part of the Verkehrsverbund Berlin-Brandenburg, the transport association serving the federal states of Berlin and Brandenburg.

References

Railway stations in Brandenburg
Railway stations in Germany opened in 1880
1880 establishments in Prussia
Buildings and structures in Märkisch-Oderland